Events from the year 1401 in Ireland.

Incumbent
Lord: Henry IV

Events
 Thomas Cranley, Primate of Ireland appointed Lord Chancellor of Ireland

Births

Deaths